University of Detroit Stadium, also known as U of D Stadium, Titan Stadium, or Dinan Field, was an outdoor athletic stadium in the north central United States, located on the campus of the University of Detroit in Detroit, Michigan. The stadium opened in 1922, on land that had been acquired for the university's proposed new McNichols campus (the university moved its main campus there in 1927).

The primary tenant was the University of Detroit Titans football team, who played their home games there from the time it opened until the university dropped the program, following the 1964 season.

Location
The stadium stood on 6 Mile Road (later also known as McNichols Road) just west of Fairfield Street at the northeast corner of the campus. The field was aligned north-south, with grandstands on the east and west sidelines, encircled by a running track. It had a seating capacity of 25,000 at its peak.

In addition to football, it was also used for track meets, concerts, and other university-related and public events.

Tenants
University of Detroit Stadium was the home field for the NFL's Detroit Lions from 1934 to 1937, and again in 1940. The Lions also played several early season home games there in 1938 and 1939. The stadium was also home to the Detroit Wolverines for their only NFL season in 1928. U of D stadium was the site of the 1935 NFL Championship Game, won by the Lions over the New York Giants, 26–7.

The Wayne Tartars football team often played home games here from 1944 to 1953 before moving into Tartar Field in 1954.

The Detroit Cougars professional soccer club played several games here in the summers of 1967 and 1968 whenever their regular home field, Tiger Stadium had a scheduling conflict. One such match in 1967 against the Houston Stars ended in an infamous player riot on June 14.

The Michigan Arrows of the fledgling Continental Football League used the stadium (which then had a capacity of 20,000) for the 1968 season. Unfortunately, the Arrows drew just 4,240 fans per game en route to a 1-11 season. The Arrows moved to Midland to become the Tri-City Apollos in 1969, then folded with the rest of the league.

Demolition
The stadium was demolished  in 1971 and was replaced by a parking lot. For many years thereafter, the stadium's lighting towers remained standing in order to provide lighting for the lot. The location is currently occupied by a multi-purpose synthetic turf field north of Calihan Hall.

References

Sports venues completed in 1922
Detroit Lions stadiums
Detroit Titans football
Defunct National Football League venues
North American Soccer League (1968–1984) stadiums
Wayne State Warriors football
Defunct college football venues
Sports venues in Detroit
Soccer venues in Michigan
Defunct soccer venues in the United States
1922 establishments in Michigan
1971 disestablishments in Michigan
Sports venues demolished in 1971
American football venues in Michigan
Demolished sports venues in Michigan